National Highway 108B, commonly referred to as NH 108B is a national highway in  India. It is a spur road of National Highway 8. NH-108B traverses the state of Tripura in India.

Route 
Agartala - Khowai.

Junctions 

  Terminal near Agartala.
  Terminal near Khowai.

See also 

 List of National Highways in India
 List of National Highways in India by state

References

External links 

 NH 108B on OpenStreetMap

National highways in India
National Highways in Tripura